KKSG-LP (103.7 FM) is a radio station licensed to Worland, Wyoming, United States. The station is currently owned by Sovereign Grace Bible Church.

References

External links
 

KSG-LP
Radio stations established in 2015
2015 establishments in Wyoming
KSG-LP
Worland, Wyoming